118th meridian may refer to:

118th meridian east, a line of longitude east of the Greenwich Meridian
118th meridian west, a line of longitude west of the Greenwich Meridian